British Antarctic Expedition may refer to:

 British Antarctic Expedition 1898–1900, also known as the Southern Cross Expedition
 British Antarctic Expedition, 1901–04, also known as the Discovery Expedition
 British Antarctic Expedition, 1907–09, also known as the Nimrod Expedition
 British Antarctic Expedition, 1910–13, also known as the Terra Nova Expedition